Chuck Cooperstein is an American sports radio personality based in Dallas, Texas.

Biography
Cooperstein is the radio voice of the Dallas Mavericks, and has been since 2005. He has also worked for Westwood One on its college football and basketball broadcasts in various periods since 1995 (Football) and 1991 (Basketball). Also since 1985, he has served as a play-by-play voice of TCU and University of Texas football, and TCU, SMU and Texas A&M basketball. Chuck has also called NFL games for Westwood One. He worked for KRLD Radio in Dallas between 1984-92; WIP Radio in Philadelphia from 1992-93; KTCK Radio in Dallas from 1994-97; WBAP Radio in Dallas from 1997-2001; KESN/ESPN from 2001-2016; Cumulus Media/ESPN from 2017-2020; ESPN Radio from 2020-21; and iHeart Radio from 2021-present.

Personal life
He is a resident of Irving, Texas with his wife Karen. He has one son; Jeffrey (born 2/27/96). He attended high school at Friends Academy in Locust Valley, NY, and college at the University of Florida

See also
KTCK (AM)

References

External links
 https://web.archive.org/web/20121125065124/http://dialglobalsports.com/chuck-cooperstein/
 http://www.nba.com/mavericks/broadcasters/mavs_announcers.html

Living people
Sportspeople from Texas
American radio sports announcers
National Football League announcers
Dallas Mavericks announcers
National Basketball Association broadcasters
College basketball announcers in the United States
College football announcers
Year of birth missing (living people)